Sujay Tarafdar (born 6 December 1989 in Bongaigaon, Assam) is an Indian cricketer who plays for Assam cricket team. He also represented the Royal Bengal Tigers in now defunct ICL. He is a right-arm medium bowler.
Tarafdar made his first-class debut on 23 November 2006 against Goa at Guwahati in the 2006–07 Ranji Trophy and List A debut on 13 February 2006 against Tripura at Jamadoba in the Ranji One-Day Trophy.

References

External links
 
 

1989 births
Living people
Indian cricketers
Assam cricketers
People from Bongaigaon district
Royal Bengal Tigers cricketers
Cricketers from Guwahati